Amman Stock Exchange (ASE) is a stock exchange private institution in Jordan, based in Amman.

History 
The ASE was established in March 1999 as a non-profit, private institution with administrative and financial autonomy. It is authorized to function as an exchange for the trading of securities. The exchange is governed by a seven-member board of directors. A chief executive officer oversees day-to-day responsibilities and reports to the board. The members of ASE are Jordan's 68 brokerage firms.

Amman Stock Exchange became state-owned company under the name "The Amman Stock Exchange Company (ASE Company)" on February 20, 2017.

The ASE is committed to the principles of fairness, transparency, efficiency, and liquidity. The exchange seeks to provide a strong and secure environment for its listed securities while protecting and guaranteeing the rights of its investors. To provide this transparent and efficient market, the ASE has implemented internationally recognized directives regarding market divisions and listing criteria.

To comply with international standards and best practices, the ASE works closely with the Jordan Securities Commission JSC on surveillance matters and maintains strong relationships with other exchanges, associations, and international organizations. The exchange is an active member of the Arab Federation of Exchanges, Federation of Euro-Asian Stock Exchanges (FEAS) and a full member of the World Federation of Exchanges (WFE).

The ASE is charged with providing enterprises with a means of raising capital by listing on the Exchange, encouraging an active market in listed securities based on the effective determination of prices and fair and transparent trading, providing modern and effective facilities and equipment for trading the recording of trades and publication of prices, monitoring and regulating market trading, coordination with the JSC as necessary, to ensure compliance with the law, a fair market and investor protection, setting out and enforcing a professional code of ethics among its member directors and staff, and ensuring the provision of timely and accurate information of issuers to the market and disseminating market information to the public

Leadership
Dr. Kamal Ahmad Al-Qudah - Chairman

Mr. Mazen Wathaifi CEO

Listed Securities 
Stocks
Bonds
 Right Issues

The ASE Indexes 
The ASE's stock indices include the ASE Unweighted Index, the ASE Market Capitalization Weighted Index and the ASE Free Float Index.

Bulletins 
Daily Bulletin
Weekly Bulletin
Monthly Bulletins
Yearly Bulletins
Monthly Statistical

See also 

Economy of Jordan
List of stock exchanges in Western Asia
List of stock exchanges

References

External links 
Amman Stock Exchange
MARKET WATCH LIVE
ASELIVE- Android
Amman Stock Exchange Government of Jordan

Stock exchanges in the Middle East
Finance in Jordan
Companies based in Amman
1999 establishments in Jordan
Financial services companies established in 1999
Divisions and subsidiaries of the prime ministry (Jordan)